Big Spring Park in Cedartown, Georgia contains a large limestone spring  producing up to four million gallons of water per day providing water to 10,000 people in the area. The Cedartown Waterworks-Woman's building and the Big Spring Park are  listed on the National Register of Historic Place

History
The original white settlers who moved into this area of northwest Georgia centered their activities around this spring, calling their town "Big Spring".  Asa Prior purchased the land around Big Spring in 1834. In 1852, Prior deeded the spring and adjacent land to the newly charted city of Cedartown. 

In more recent times, the spring was turned into a park.  A modern water treatment facility was installed on the site at 301 Wissahickon Avenue, which pumps water via pipelines to the surrounding areas.  In 2000, the American Water Works Association named the Cedartown Water Plant an American Water Landmark.

Images

References

 American Water Works Association. (retrieved 11 September 2004). Water Landmarks. 
 Polk County Chamber of Commerce. (retrieved 9 September 2004). About Polk County.
 Georgia Historical Commission.  Big Spring Park sign, posted in the park. 

Big Spring Park
Big Spring Park
Parks in Georgia (U.S. state)